James Bertram (1872–1934) was the personal secretary of Andrew Carnegie, the industrialist and philanthropist, from 1897-1914. Bertram also served the Carnegie Corporation of New York from its inception in 1911 as secretary and trustee until his death in 1934. He thus continued to have an important role in Carnegie's philanthropic projects after Carnegie's death in 1919.

Early life
Bertram was born in Corstorphine, near Edinburgh, the Scottish capital where was educated at Daniel Stewart's College.  His first position was with the Great Northern and Northeastern Railway company in Edinburgh. He emigrated to South Africa, where he continued to work in the railway industry. He returned to Scotland for health reasons in 1897, and was recruited by Andrew Carnegie, who had recently acquired a Scottish home, Skibo Castle.

Activities in the United States
In the US Bertram by 1908 supervised Carnegie's library program.  He took a close interest in the new Carnegie libraries, commenting on the architectural plans submitted by applicants.  Bertram's interventions discouraged extravagant architectural features and encouraged adherence to published guidelines. 

The Carnegie Libraries in Iowa Project notes that Bertram was empowered by Andrew Carnegie to carry on negotiations, answer questions, and oversee contractual arrangements. The Carnegie Libraries in Iowa Project further asserts that Bertram, and not Carnegie, was the one who established the eligibility requirements for a community to receive funding. While he did not exhibit much of a fluid or articulate communication style -- leaving his letters, notes, responses, etc. more confused and misinformed than enlightened by his instructions, Bertram considered the power Carnegie entrusted to him as a kind of sacred trust demanding his protection. Therefore, Bertram established the primary requirements that the community population should be sufficiently large to support the library. He also determined, as time went on, that beautiful architectural enhancements that adorned the library buildings – domes, marble staircases, statues -- had to be eliminated in order to cut down on costs and to improve the libraries functionality and working space for library services. He began a campaign of informing inquiring groups with pamphlets on the need for practicality of design so that the grant amount would cover the construction costs to make it ready for immediate occupancy and fulfillment of its purpose. Bertram's rigorous guardianship of the Carnegie trust had the immediate effect he desired; however, it also caused substantial difficulties for some Iowa communities seeking to build libraries with Carnegie funding. It was these stipulations that Alice S. Tyler quietly but strongly objected to during her time as Secretary, seeking to have them removed and encouraging Iowa communities to pursue local financial support and reject the Carnegie funds.  

Bertram authored Notes on Library Buildings, a work which included complete plans, in 1910.  Bertram also involved himself with grants for pipe organs, and other projects. Booker T. Washington's published correspondence gives details of how Bertram acted as an intermediary between Carnegie and the recipients of his largesse.

References

1872 births
1934 deaths
Secretaries
Scottish emigrants to the United States
People educated at Stewart's Melville College
Carnegie libraries